Paul Michael Parker (born October 31, 1949) is an American businessman and politician from the U.S. state of Mississippi. He served in Congress as a member of the Democratic Party and, later, the Republican Party. He later served as Assistant Secretary of the U.S. Army, with authority over the U.S. Army Corps of Engineers.

Biography
Parker was born in Laurel, Mississippi and he graduated from William Carey College with a BA in English in 1970. Before entering politics, Parker owned and operated a funeral home business, insurance companies, land and timber companies, and a sand, clay and gravel business. Parker was elected to the House of Representatives as a Democrat in 1988 following a hard-fought primary with a wide field of contenders. The district included Jackson, Vicksburg, Natchez, McComb, and Brookhaven.

Party switch

As a Democratic congressman, Parker wore his party ties very loosely. His voting record was conservative even by Mississippi Democratic standards. During Parker's successful 1992 general election campaign, he did not endorse Democratic Presidential candidate Bill Clinton. After his re-election in November 1994, Parker voted 'Present' in the election for Speaker of the House in 1995 instead of voting for the House Democratic leader Richard Gephardt.

On November 10, 1995, Parker joined the Republican Party. Although his district was almost 40 percent African-American—one of the highest percentages for a Republican-held district—Parker was reelected with little difficulty in 1996. He did not run for re-election in 1998 in order to focus on his bid for Governor of Mississippi.

In the 1999 gubernatorial election Parker had almost 9,000 fewer votes than his Democratic opponent, Lieutenant Governor Ronnie Musgrove. However, due to the presence of two minor candidates, Musgrove came up a few thousand votes short of a majority.  Under the state constitution, a gubernatorial candidate must win a majority of the popular vote and a majority of state house districts.  Each candidate carried 61 of the 122 state house districts.  The election was thus decided by the state house, where the Democrats had a supermajority at the time.  However, Parker refused to concede, and the House elected Musgrove 86-36 along partisan lines.

Army Corps
Parker was appointed by George W. Bush as Assistant Secretary of the Army (Civil Works), with oversight of the Army Corps of Engineers, which has numerous projects in Parker's home state of Mississippi. Parker was one of the first political casualties of the Bush administration's heavily centralized management style when he spoke out to promote the Corps of Engineers priorities and was then asked to leave in the summer of 2002. In recent years Parker has been a Washington lobbyist, specializing in infrastructure issues.

Post-politics
In August 2020, Parker endorsed Democrat Joe Biden for President, along with 26 other former Republican members of Congress.

See also
 List of American politicians who switched parties in office
 List of United States representatives who switched parties

References

External links

Parker's lobbying profile

|-

|-

|-

1949 births
American lobbyists
Democratic Party members of the United States House of Representatives from Mississippi
George W. Bush administration personnel
Living people
Mississippi Republicans
People from Laurel, Mississippi
Republican Party members of the United States House of Representatives
United States Department of Defense officials
Members of Congress who became lobbyists